Up North may refer to:

 Northern Minnesota, including the North Shore, Boundary Waters Canoe Area Wilderness, Superior National Forest, and other areas north of the Twin Cities with an abundance of lakes and personal cabins, by residents of Minnesota. 
 Northern Michigan, by residents of the lower peninsula of Michigan
Northern Saskatchewan, by residents of Southern Saskatchewan
 Northern Highland, Wisconsin
 Lake Superior Lowland, Wisconsin
 Up North (book), a 1992 book by Charles Jennings
 Up North (film), a 2018 Nigerian film
 Up North, a comedy series on the Essex TV website, Sheffield Live
 Up North Combine, a British amalgamation of pigeon racing clubs
"Up North (Down South, Back East, Out West)", a song by Wade Hayes from the album Highways & Heartaches

See also
 "It's Grim Up North", a 1991 song by The Justified Ancients of Mu Mu (The JAMs)
 It's Nice Up North, a 2006 comedy documentary made by Graham Fellows as his alter ego John Shuttleworth
 Down south (disambiguation)